John Smythe may refer to:

Politicians
John Smythe (High Sheriff of Kent), MP for Aylesbury and Hythe
John Smythe (MP for Buckingham) (c.1599–1640), MP for Buckingham, 1626
John Smythe (MP for Richmond) (died 1599/1600), MP for Richmond

Others
John Smythe (field hockey) (born 1989), Canadian field hockey player
John Smythe (playwright), involved with the establishment of Nindethana Theatre in Melbourne, Australia, in 1971
John Smythe (screenwriter) of The Search for Animal Chin (1987)
John H. Smythe (1844–1908), United States ambassador to Liberia
 John Henry Clavell Smythe (1915–1996), Sierra Leone Creole, Royal Air Force member and lawyer
Sir John Smythe, 3rd Baronet (died 1737) of the Smythe baronets
Sir John Smythe, 8th Baronet (1827–1919) of the Smythe baronets

See also
John Smyth (disambiguation)
John Smith (disambiguation)